Emmanuel Boateng may refer to:

Emmanuel Boateng (footballer, born 1994), Ghanaian footballer
Emmanuel Boateng (footballer, born 1996), Ghanaian footballer
Emmanuel Boateng (footballer, born 1997), Ghanaian footballer